Diego Umaña (born 18 April 1945) is a Colombian footballer. He played in eight matches for the Colombia national football team from 1975 to 1981. He was also part of Colombia's squad for the 1975 Copa América tournament.

References

1945 births
Living people
Colombian footballers
Colombia international footballers
Association football midfielders
Deportivo Cali footballers
Atlético Bucaramanga footballers
Millonarios F.C. players
Independiente Santa Fe footballers
Colombian football managers
Once Caldas managers
Independiente Santa Fe managers
América de Cali managers
Barcelona S.C. managers
Millonarios F.C. managers
Deportes Tolima managers
Deportes Quindío managers
Atlético Junior managers
Juan Aurich managers
Sport Huancayo managers
Colombian expatriate football managers
Expatriate football managers in Ecuador
Expatriate football managers in Peru